Cameron Mark King (born 10 September 1995) is a footballer who last played as a midfielder for King's Lynn. Born in England, King represents Scotland internationally.

Club career
King joined Norwich City's youth system at the age of eight. King made his senior début for Norwich City on 23 September 2014 in the League Cup in a 1–0 away loss to Shrewsbury Town.

In 2016 King and Norwich mutually agreed to end his contract early, in order for him to receive medical care for persistent migraines. After seeing a specialist, King returned to football with Thetford Town, where he scored 16 goals in 45 appearances in all competitions. King joined League of Ireland Premier Division side Shamrock Rovers on 14 August 2017.

On 24 August 2020, King re-signed for National League side Kings Lynn. King was released by the club following relegation at the end of the 2021–22 season.

International career
King has represented Scotland at youth level. He scored a goal in his first appearance for the Scotland under-21s, a late equaliser in a 1–1 draw with Switzerland under-21s.

Career statistics

References

External links

1995 births
Living people
Association football midfielders
Sportspeople from Bury St Edmunds
Scottish footballers
Scotland under-21 international footballers
English footballers
English people of Scottish descent
Norwich City F.C. players
Thetford Town F.C. players
Shamrock Rovers F.C. players
King's Lynn Town F.C. players
FC Halifax Town players
National League (English football) players